Devlin is an American animated television series produced by Hanna-Barbera Productions and broadcast for 17 episodes on ABC from September 7 to December 21, 1974, with reruns airing until September 1976. The series, inspired by the popularity of motorcycle daredevil Evel Knievel, featured a stunt motorcyclist with a traveling circus named Ernie Devlin and his siblings Tod and Sandy. It was one of Hanna-Barbera's few dramatic series.

The original title for the show was Wild Wheels, and the title character was "Dare" Devlin. Concerned about potential criticism that the show glorified dangerous activity, ABC nixed the title, changed the character's name to Ernie, and mandated the regular presentation of safety tips.

Plot
Ernie Devlin is a motorcycle stunt rider who is a part of a traveling circus owned by Hank McSummers. His siblings Tod and Sandy help out in preparing his stunts as they have various adventures along the way.

Cast
The main characters were:
 Michael Bell as Ernie Devlin
 Micky Dolenz as Tod Devlin
 Michelle Robinson as Sandy Devlin
 Norman Alden as Henry "Hank" McSummers

Additional
 Philip Clarke
 Don Diamond
 Sarina Grant
 Bob Hastings
 David Jolliffe
 Robby Lester
 Stan Livingston
 Derrel Maury
 Barney Phillips
 Fran Ryan
 John Stephenson
 John Tuell
 Ginny Tyler
 Don Wells
 Jesse White

Episodes

Home media
On May 24, 2016, Warner Archive released Devlin: The Complete Series on DVD in region 1 as part of their Hanna–Barbera Classics Collection. This is a Manufacture-on-Demand (MOD) release, available exclusively through Warner's online store and Amazon.

Other appearances
An elderly and overweight Ernie Devlin appeared in several episodes of Harvey Birdman, Attorney at Law (most prominently "The Devlin Made Me Do It" and "Grodin") voiced by Toby Huss.

Ernie Devlin will appear in the HBO Max original series Jellystone!.

References

External links
 

American Broadcasting Company original programming
1970s American animated television series
1974 American television series debuts
1974 American television series endings
Television series by Hanna-Barbera
English-language television shows
American children's animated action television series
Circus television shows